Yokosuka, Kanagawa is a city in Kanagawa Prefecture, Japan. Yokosuka may also refer to:

Places

Yokosuka Line, a railway line connecting the city to other places
Yokosuka Sogo High School, a secondary school located in the city
 Yokosuka Domain, a Japanese feudal domain of the Edo period, located in Tōtōmi Province
 Yokosuka Castle, a castle central to the domain

Naval Facilities 
United States Fleet Activities Yokosuka, a United States naval base located next to the city, beginning in 1945
JMSDF Yokosuka District Force (横須賀地方隊) a modern naval district of Japan's territorial waters (see Japan Maritime Self-Defense Force#Organization, formations and structure)
JMSDF Yokosuka Naval Base (横須賀基地_(海上自衛隊)), which hosts the headquarters of the Japanese Maritime Self Defense Force as well as several major units assigned to the district.
Yokosuka Naval District was a historical administrative district of the pre-war Imperial Japanese Navy.
Naval Air Technical Arsenal at Yokosuka, an aircraft manufacturer located in the city from the 1910s to the 1930s.
Yokosuka Naval Arsenal, a shipyard located outside the city from the 1860s to 1945
Yokosuka Naval Airfield a WWII-era airfield

Aircraft
Yokosuka B3Y, a carrier-based torpedo bomber of the 1930s
Yokosuka B4Y, a carrier attack aircraft used by the Imperial Japanese Navy Air Service
Yokosuka D3Y, a two-seat dive bomber
Yokosuka E1Y, a Japanese floatplane of the 1920s
Yokosuka E5Y, a single-engine Japanese seaplane used for reconnaissance
Yokosuka E14Y, an Imperial Japanese Navy reconnaissance seaplane
Yokosuka H5Y, a flying boat
Yokosuka K4Y, a floatplane trainer of the 1930s
Yokosuka K5Y, a two-seat unequal-span biplane trainer
Yokosuka MXY7 Ohka, a purpose-built, rocket powered aircraft
Yokosuka MXY8, a training glider
Yokosuka MXY9, a projected development of the MXY8 training glider
Yokosuka P1Y, a twin-engine, land-based bomber developed for the Japanese Imperial Navy in World War II
Yokosuka R2Y, a prototype reconnaissance aircraft built in Japan late in World War II